Stephen Fielding Bayne Jr. (May 21, 1908January 18, 1974) was bishop of the Diocese of Olympia in The Episcopal Church and the first Executive Officer of the Anglican Communion.

Early life and ministry 
Bayne was born on May 21, 1908. He was educated at Amherst College where he received a B.A. in 1929. Bayne then attended General Theological Seminary from which he received an S.T.B. in 1933. He remained at General Theological Seminary for two years as a fellow and tutor. He was ordained to the diaconate of the Episcopal Church in 1932 and to the priesthood in 1933. He served as a parish priest in St. Louis and Northampton, Massachusetts, until 1941, when he was appointed chaplain and chairman of the department of religion at Columbia University where he remained until 1947, except for two years of duty as a Naval chaplain in World War II. On December 9, 1944, he was elected bishop of the Diocese of Olympia on the fourth ballot as a surprise nomination from the floor. He served until 1959, when he resigned to accept an appointment by the Archbishop of Canterbury as the first Executive Officer of the Anglican Communion; he took up the role on January 1, 1960, and held simultaneous responsibility for the American Episcopal churches of Europe.

Anglican Communion 
This appointment was both an honor and a great responsibility. The Anglican Communion was just beginning to step into a more significant and authoritative role as a liaison between the various Anglican church bodies. Bayne is reported to have said regarding this new appointment, "I am rather like a mosquito in a nudist camp. I know what I ought to do, but I don't know where to begin."

The apex of his time as Executive Officer was the 1963 Anglican Congress in Toronto. There, delegates approved a document drafted primarily by Bayne titled “Mutual Responsibility and Interdependence in the Body of Christ.” MRI called for new patterns of being Anglican marked by “the birth of entirely new relationships” and declared “our unity in Christ… is the most profound bond among us, in all our political and racial and cultural diversity.” MRI — and Bayne —w as widely hailed as a break with an outdated Anglican past, even appearing on the front page of The New York Times.

Bayne stepped down as Executive Officer in October 1964. He narrowly lost the election for presiding bishop that year but still accepted a position at the Episcopal Church Center in New York. As a bishop, he chaired the heresy investigation of Bishop Pike. In 1970, he returned to General Seminary as professor and later dean. He died on January 18, 1974.

References 

1908 births
1974 deaths
20th-century American Episcopalians
Episcopal bishops of Olympia
20th-century American clergy